"Caroline" is a song by Australian band the Badloves, released in September 1994 as the lead single from the band's second studio album, Holy Roadside (1995). The song peaked at number 63 on the Australian ARIA Singles Chart.

Track listing
Australian maxi-CD single (D523)
 "Caroline" – 3:05
 "Don't Throw Roses" – 3:37
 "Flying" – 3:07
 "Burnout" – 3:05

Charts

References

1995 songs
1995 singles
The Badloves songs
Mushroom Records singles